Virginia's 31st House of Delegates district election, 2013, held November 5, 2013, was a contest between incumbent Republican Scott Lingamfelter and Democratic challenger Jeremy McPike. McPike ran on the issues of quality of life, transportation, education, and energy. Lingamfelter wanted to streamline government.

Results

See also
Virginia's 31st House of Delegates district

References

2013 Virginia elections